Ashley Wallbridge (born 28 February 1988) is an English DJ, producer, and remixer hailing from Stoke-on-Trent. He is best known for his unique sound and his big room tracks. His debut album, "The Inner Me" was released on 9 March 2012 on Armada Music.

Discography

Studio albums
The Inner Me (2012)
Kingdom United (with Gareth Emery) (2019)
Ready for Life (2021)

Extended plays
The Embrace - EP (2008)
I Believe (featuring Meighan Nealon) - EP (2009)
My Blood (featuring Meighan Nealon) - EP (2009)
Masquerade - EP (2009)
Faces (with Andy Moor) (featuring Meighan Nealon) - EP (2009)
Harmonies / Melodies - EP (2010)
Smoke / Rhythm - EP (2010)
Liquid / Moonlight Sonata - EP (2011)

Singles
Jarhead (2008)
Livian (2008)
Reker (2008)
Spirits (2008)
Omega (2008)
Addicted (2008)
New Moonlight (2008)
Captive (2008)
Tempest (2008)
The Epic (2008)
Atman (2009)
Solideritet (2009)
Dionysus (2009)
Overture (2009)
Spitfire (2009)
Harrier (2009)
My Blood (featuring Meighan Nealon) (2009)
Faces (with Andy Moor) (featuring Meighan Nealon) (2009)
Shotokan (2009)
Chimera (2009)
Walk on Water (featuring Elleah) (2010)
Jynx (2011)
Vision (2011)
Mansion (with Gareth Emery) (2011)
Meta4 (2012)
Mumbai Traffic (2012)
World To Turn (2012)
Zorro (2012)
Bang The Drum (2012)
Keep The Fire (2012)
Grenade (2012)
Chase The Night (2013)
Yin-Yang (2013)
 Crush (2013)
Africa (2013)
Summertime (2016)
Melody (featuring Karra) (2016)
Amnesia (2016)
See Your Face (featuring Carlos Pena) (2016)
Goa (2017)
Undiscovered (featuring Karra) (2017)
Won't Back Down (featuring Stu Gabriel) (2017)
Naughts & Crosses (2017)
FaceOff (with Andy Moor) (2017)
Strings (2017)
Surrender (with Darude) (2018)
Gods (featuring Nash) (2018)
Kingdom United (with Gareth Emery) (2019)
Lionheart (with Gareth Emery) (2019)
Electric Pirates (with Gareth Emery) (2019)
Amber Sun (with Gareth Emery) (2019)
"Never Before" (with Gareth Emery featuring Jonathan Mendelsohn) (2019)
"Diamonds" (featuring Clara Yates) (2019)
"On the Move" (2019)
"Still Alive" (featuring Evan Henzi) (2020)
"World For You" (featuring Sarah De Warren) (2021)
"As It Rains" (with Daly Brightness featuring Gid Sedgwick) (2021)
"All My Life" (with Darren Styles featuring Gavin Beach) (2021)
"Golden Hour" (2021)
"Beautiful Lies" (featuring Dean Chalmers) (2021)
"Ghost of You" (with Nash featuring Sally Oh) (2021)
"Neon Rave" (2021)
"5000 Miles" (featuring Bodine) (2021)
"Arena" (2022)

Remixes
Gai Barone - Appetite (Ashley Wallbridge Remix) (2008)
Solarity - Laika (Ashley Wallbridge Remix) (2009)
Phillip Alpha - Sudden Changes (Ashley Wallbridge Remix) (2009)
Jonathan Martin - Insidious (Ashley Wallbridge Remix) (2009)
Super8 & Tab - Irufushi (Ashley Wallbridge Remix) (2009)
Dakota - Steel Libido (Ashley Wallbridge Remix) (2009)
Ferry Corsten - Feel You (Ashley Wallbridge Remix) (2009)
DJ Eco - What Do You See? (Ashley Wallbridge Remix) (2009)
Moonbeam - We Are in Words (Ashley Wallbridge Remix) (2009)
Michael Angelo & Solo - Alone (Ashley Wallbridge Remix) (2010)
Tritonal - Forgive Me, Forget You (Ashley Wallbridge Remix) (2010)
Andy Moor - She Moves (Ashley Wallbridge Remix) (2010)
Gaia - Aisha (Ashley Wallbridge Remix) (2010)
Gareth Emery - Arrival (Ashley Wallbridge Remix) (2011)
Pryda - Melo (Ashley Wallbridge 'The Inner Me' Mix) (2012)
Topher Jones and Amada featuring Ido - Hello Chicago (Ashley Wallbridge Remix) (2012)
Clean Bandit featuring Jess Glynne - Rather Be (Ashley Wallbridge Remix) (2014)
Signum featuring Scott Mac – "Coming on Strong" (Gareth Emery and Ashley Wallbridge Remix) (2018)
Gareth Emery - Long Way Home (Ashley Wallbridge Remix) (2018)
Johann Stone and Kokaholla featuring Sykamore - End of Time (Ashley Wallbridge Remix) (2019)
Super8 - Alba (Ashley Wallbridge Remix) (2019)
Andrew Rayel and Tensteps featuring Runaground - Carry You Home (Ashley Wallbridge Remix) (2021)

Compilations
Digital Society - Volume Three (Mixed by Ashley Wallbridge and Activa) (2010)
Trance World, Vol. 11 (Mixed by Ashley Wallbridge) (2011)

References

External links
 
 discogs.com  Discography

Living people
Armada Music artists
English house musicians
English DJs
Club DJs
Remixers
British trance musicians
1988 births